Olive Frances Gibbs, DL (née Cox; 17 February 1918 – 28 September 1995) was a British Labour politician and anti-nuclear weapons campaigner.

Gibbs entered Oxfordshire politics in 1953 and became the second woman Lord Mayor of Oxford (the first was Florence Kathleen Lower). She served as Lord Mayor twice, in 1974–75 and 1981–82, stepping in the second time to replace a colleague who had died halfway through his term. She was also the first woman to chair Oxfordshire County Council. Her husband, Edmund (accountant and founder of an eponymous Oxfordshire firm) was also a councillor for some time.

Gibbs chaired the Campaign for Nuclear Disarmament between 1964 and 1967. She was made an Honorary Freeman both of the City of Oxford and of the City of London.
She was awarded Oxford Brookes University's first-ever honorary degree in 1986 and was a Deputy Lieutenant of Oxfordshire.  Gibbs Crescent, a new street of social housing, was named after her, as was the Humanities building at Oxford Brookes (then Oxford Polytechnic).

A blue plaque to Olive Gibbs was unveiled on her childhood home at Christ Church Old Buildings, St Thomas's, Oxford on 11 April 2015.

An oil portrait of Gibbs by P.G. Rose is held by Oxford Brookes University, and reproduced in the Art UK catalogue.

See also
List of peace activists

References

 Our Olive: The Autobiography of Olive Gibbs, Robert Dugdale, 1989 -

External links
 Olive Gibbs: Local politician and campaigner — Oxfordshire Blue plaque awarded to Olive Gibbs

1918 births
1995 deaths
Labour Party (UK) councillors
People from Oxford
Campaign for Nuclear Disarmament activists
Members of Oxford City Council
Members of Oxfordshire County Council
Lord Mayors of Oxford
Deputy Lieutenants of Oxfordshire
Women mayors of places in England
Women councillors in England